Besim Sahatçiu (2 October 193520 October 2005) was a Kosovo-Albanian director of theatre and film.

Biography 
After finishing gymnasium in Pejë, Sahatçiu studied literature at the University of Belgrade. Following the interruption of his studies due to compulsory military service, he worked as a translator for the publisher, Rilindja. He later studied at the Academy of Dramatic Art in Zagreb, Croatia, and defended his thesis with staging Gogol's satirical play, The Government Inspector, at People's Provincial Theatre in Pristina.

Sahatçiu's ethnographic film, 117, won the Grand Prix at the Belgrade Documentary and Short Film Festival in 1978. The film was described as a “spiritual portrait of the nation.”

As a theatre director, Sahatçiu worked at the National Theatre of Kosovo in Pristina.

In 2018, Kosovo's Ministry of Culture posthumously honored Sahatçiu with a Lifetime Achievement Award for Cinematography. The same year, a street in Pristina was named after him. In 2021, Posta e Kosovës issued postage stamps in its 'Arti skenik – Besim Sahatçiu dhe Leze Qena' series, commemorating Sahatçiu and Leze Qena.

Filmography 

Crveni udar (1974)
Trimi (1975)
Tito na Kosovu (1975)
Gëzuar viti i ri (1976)
Pehlivanët (1976)
117 (1976)
Pasqyra (1977)
Duke pritur Godon (1977)
Era dhe lisi (1979)
Tito e Kosova 79 (1980)
Tre vetë kapërcejn malin (1981)
Përroi vërshues (1983)
Lulepjeshkat e dashurisë (1988)

References

External links 
 
 Besim Sahatçiu on MUBI

1935 births
2005 deaths
Kosovan film directors
Kosovan film producers
Kosovan screenwriters
Albanian theatre directors
Albanian film directors
Albanian film producers
Albanian screenwriters
Albanian translators
Rita Ora
People from Peja
Kosovo Albanians
University of Belgrade alumni
Academy of Dramatic Art, University of Zagreb alumni
20th-century translators
20th-century screenwriters